The Kazakh Horse is a horse breed of the Kazakh people, who live mainly in Kazakhstan, but also in parts of China, Mongolia, Russia and Uzbekistan.  It is used mainly as a riding horse, and is known for its hardiness and stamina.

Characteristics
The Kazakh horse averages  for stallions and mares average . The breed is criticized for a short stride and a jolting trot. However, they are also very hardy and able to cover long distances.

The breed consists of two subtypes, the Adaev and the Dzhab or Jabe.  The Dzhabe developed in the southern districts of Aktubinsk. They have a heavy head, thick, short neck, and deep chest.  They have a straight back, strong legs and a well-muscled croup. They are usually bay, dark bay, chestnut or gray. The Adaevs are more refined with lighter heads, longer necks, and well-defined withers. Due to the primitive conditions in which they live, this strain is more susceptible to developing narrow chests and light bone structure.

History

Horses in the region of Kazakhstan date to the 5th century B.C.  Early influences on what today is the Kazakh horse include the Akhal-Teke, Arabian, Karabair, and Mongolian horse. Beginning in the 20th century, the breed had additional infusions of blood from the Russian Don, Orlov Trotter and the Thoroughbred.

The Kazakh today resembles a more elegant version of the Mongolian horse.  The breed is still bred by once-nomadic Kazakh tribesmen, although cross-breeding has somewhat diluted the traditional bloodlines.

Uses
Today, the Kazakh horses are seen mostly in western Kazakhstan, where there are over 300,000.  The main use of the Kazakh is for riding, although they are also bred for horsemeat.

Literature 
The Kazakh horse is mentioned in several stories passed down in Kazakh, Slavic, and Central Asian cultures.

The Horse and The Camel 
In ancient times, Horse said to the Sun:

“Oh, generous Sun, the giver of life! They call me one of the most beautiful animals. But I think some parts of me could be improved upon.”

“And what is that?” The Sun asked, smiling.

“If my legs got strong and sturdy, and my neck became as long as a swan’s, that would make me prettier. If my chest were wider, I would be stronger, and I also wouldn’t mind a permanent saddle so people could ride me all the time.”

“Well,” the Sun answered cheerfully, “Have it your way.” And so the Sun brought a camel to Earth. “Here is the animal made by your description. It has long legs, a long neck, like that of a swan, a broad chest, and a ready-made saddle. So, do you want to become the same as it?”

“N-n-no!” Said the horse, trembling with fear.

From that day on, camels have existed on Earth.

A Poem About Difference in Taste 
Having glanced at the Camel, the Horse said,

"What a gigantic bastard-horse".

The Camel cried,

"Are you really a horse?!

You are simply an underdeveloped camel".

The silver-bearded God only knows

That these are animals of different breeds.

See also
Kustanair

References

External links

Horse breeds
Horse breeds originating in Kazakhstan
Horse breeds originating in Uzbekistan